Man of the Forest is a 1926 American silent Western film directed by John Waters and written by Zane Grey, Max Marcin and Fred Myton. The film stars Jack Holt, Georgia Hale, El Brendel, Warner Oland, Tom Kennedy, George Fawcett and Ivan Christy. The film was released on December 27, 1926, by Paramount Pictures.

Henry Hathaway directed a remake in 1933 starring Randolph Scott, with Scott darkening his hair and wearing a moustache to match stock footage of Holt playing the part. Noah Beery Sr. portrayed Warner Oland's part as Clint Beasley in the remake while Tom Kennedy reprised his role as the Sheriff.

Cast 
 Jack Holt as Milt Dale
 Georgia Hale as Nancy Raynor
 El Brendel as Horace Pipp
 Warner Oland as Clint Beasley
 Tom Kennedy as Sheriff
 George Fawcett as Nancy's Uncle
 Ivan Christy as Snake Anson
 Bruce Gordon as Jim Wilson
 Vester Pegg as Moses
 Willard Cooley as Deputy Sheriff
 Guy Oliver as First Deputy
 Walter Ackerman as Second Deputy
 Duke R. Lee as Martin Mulvery

References

External links 
 

1926 films
1926 Western (genre) films
Paramount Pictures films
Films directed by John Waters (director born 1893)
American black-and-white films
Silent American Western (genre) films
Films based on works by Zane Grey
1920s English-language films
1920s American films